The Fifth Corner is an American television series which aired on NBC and produced by TriStar Television in 1992. The two-hour pilot aired on April 17, 1992, and one final episode aired the week after.

Series overview
Richard Braun (McArthur) is a man who wakes up one day with absolutely no recollection of who he is. It's a bad time for him to suffer from amnesia, as he also discovers to his horror he wakes up next to a dead woman in bed.

Aided by his sidekick/driver Boone (Freeman), Braun sets out to try to discover his real identity. He returns home to find items such as designer clothes, weapons, fake IDs and passports, which leads him to believe that he is a deep-undercover spy. He also learns a little bit about his likes and dislikes. There are also some bad guys led by Dr. Grandwell (Coburn) who would like to know about his past and real identity. During this process, a reporter named Erica Fontaine (Delaney) also sets out to find out more about who Braun is.

Cast
Alex McArthur as Richard Braun
J. E. Freeman as Boone
Julia Nickson-Soul as 
James Coburn as Dr. Grandwell
Kim Delaney as Erica Fontaine
Anthony Valentine as The Hat

Episodes

TV Ratings
Ep 1: 8.5 household rating (Competition: Janek: Murder Times Seven (Repeat) [7.7 rating])
Ep 2: 7 rating (lead in I'll Fly Away garnered an 8 rating at 9pm)
Competition: 20/20 [14.4 rating]; Burt Reynolds Special (Repeat) [7.9]

Reception

Similar Series
Coronet Blue (CBS, 1967)
John Doe on FOX

External links
Short-Lived Shows: The Fifth Corner
 

1992 American television series debuts
1992 American television series endings
NBC original programming
Television series by Sony Pictures Television
Espionage television series
English-language television shows
Television shows set in Philadelphia